Manuel La Rosa (born 20 March 1992) is an Italian footballer.

Biography
Born in Rome, Lazio, La Rosa started his career at Grosseto. He was the member of the reserve from 2009 to 2011. He also received first team call-up since October 2010. He wore no.42 shirt in 2010–11 season and made his debut on 29 May 2011 against Atalanta, the last round of the season. In 2011–12 season he changed to wear no.24 shirt. However, he left for Isola Liri on 9 August.

On 2 August 2012, La Rosa was signed by Parma. On 31 August he was signed by Foligno. On 12 January 2013 La Rosa left for Savona, along with Alessio Aracu and Tommaso Cancelloni from Parma in temporary deals. Aracu and Cancelloni were youth product of Grosseto too. On 11 July 2013 Aracu and La Rosa remained in Savona for another season.

References

External links
 AIC profile (data by football.it) 

Italian footballers
F.C. Grosseto S.S.D. players
A.C. Isola Liri players
A.S.D. Città di Foligno 1928 players
Savona F.B.C. players
Serie B players
Serie C players
Association football midfielders
Footballers from Rome
1992 births
Living people